The 2020 British Champions Series, sponsored by QIPCO, was the 10th edition of the horse racing series comprising 35 of the UK's top flat races. 

The series was scheduled to begin with the 2,000 Guineas at Newmarket on 2 May, however the Guineas Festival was cancelled due to the COVID-19 pandemic, with the 2,000 and 1,000 Guineas races postponed until 6 and 7 June, respectively. The series began with the Coronation Cup at Newmarket (moved from Epsom) on 5 June. The Epsom Derby and Oaks, scheduled to be held in early June, were postponed until July. The Lockinge Stakes at Newbury was cancelled.

The series concluded with British Champions Day at Ascot on 17 October.

Results

The series was split into five categories: Sprint, Mile, Middle Distance, Long Distance and Fillies & Mares. Each category included seven races.

Sprint

Mile

Middle Distance

Long Distance

Fillies & Mares

See also

 2020 Epsom Derby
 2020 King George VI and Queen Elizabeth Stakes
 2020 Breeders' Cup Challenge series

References

External links
 Official website

British Champions Series
British Champions Series
British Champions Series
British Champions Series
British Champions Series
British Champions Series
British Champions Series
British Champions Series
British Champions Series